Noor mosque is an Ahmadi mosque in Crawley in the borough of West Sussex, England. The mosque was opened on 18 January 2014.

References

Buildings and structures in Crawley
Religious buildings and structures in West Sussex
Temples in England